The Whiting River is a stream, about  long, in the U.S. state of Alaska and the Canadian province of British Columbia. It enters the waters of Stephens Passage at the Borough of Juneau in the Alaska Panhandle between the mouths of the Taku and Stikine Rivers. The main tributary of the Whiting is the South Whiting. Its origin is in the Chechidla Range, and its terminus is at Gilbert Bay, which empties into Stephens Passage.
In 1888, Lieutenant Commander C. M. Thomas of the U.S. Navy (USN) named the river for assistant surgeon Robert Whiting, USN, a member of his surveying party.

See also
List of rivers of Alaska
List of British Columbia rivers

References

Rivers of Alaska
Rivers of the Boundary Ranges
Stikine Country
International rivers of North America
Rivers of Juneau, Alaska